This is a list of transfers in Dutch football for the 2011 Summer transfer window. Only moves featuring an Eredivisie side and/or an Eerste Divisie side are listed.

The winter transfer window will open on July 1, 2011, and will close on August 31. Deals may be signed at any given moment in the season, but the actual transfer may only take place during the transfer window. Unattached players may sign at any moment.

See also
 Football in the Netherlands
 Transfer window

References

Football transfers winter 2011-12
2011
Dutch